Ioan Adrian Viciu (born 14 January 1991 in Târgu Mureș) is a Romanian football player who plays as a goalkeeper.

External links

 Profile on liga1.ro
 

Living people
1991 births
Romanian footballers
Sportspeople from Târgu Mureș
Cádiz CF B players
ASA 2013 Târgu Mureș players
FC Sportul Studențesc București players
AFC Săgeata Năvodari players
Liga I players
Association football goalkeepers